Hafdís Elín Helgadóttir (born 23 January 1965) is an Icelandic former basketball player. She spent a record 25 seasons in the Úrvalsdeild kvenna, scoring 3,180 points in 362 games. She retired as the Úrvalsdeild all-time leader list in career games played but has since been surpassed by Birna Valgarðsdóttir. As a member of ÍS, she won the national championship in 1991 and the Icelandic Basketball Cup in 1991 and 2003. In 2001 she was named to the Icelandic basketball team of the 20th century.

Playing career
Hafdís played her first game on 7 October 1985 with ÍS where she spent 22 seasons and played in six Basketball Cup finals, winning the cup twice. After ÍS folded in 2007, she transferred to Valur, where she last played in 2013.

Coaching career
Hafdís was hired as an assistant coach to Ágúst Björgvinsson with Valur prior to the 2011-2012 Úrvalsdeild kvenna season. She won the Icelandic Company Cup with the team in 2013.

Icelandic national team
Hafdís played 13 games for the Icelandic women's national basketball team between 1986 and 1993.

Awards, titles and accomplishments

Individual awards
Úrvalsdeild Domestic All-First Team : 1991

Titles
Icelandic champion (5): 1991
Icelandic Basketball Cup (2): 1991, 2003
Icelandic Supercup: 1998

References

External links
Icelandic statistics 2009-2013

1965 births
Living people
Icelandic basketball coaches
Hafdis Helgadottir
Hafdis Helgadottir
Valur women's basketball players
Valur women's basketball coaches
ÍS women's basketball players
Forwards (basketball)